Leonardo Jesús Cardona Palacio (born October 8, 1971 in Envigado, Antioquia) is a retired male road bicycle racer and track cyclist from Colombia, who became a professional rider in 1995.

Career

1990
 in Pan American Championships, Track, Points Race, Duitama (COL)
1994
  in Pan American Championships, Track, Points Race, Curicó (CHI)
1995
1st in Stage 7 Vuelta a Colombia, Cali (COL)
1997
1st in Stage 13 Vuelta a Colombia, Circuito Bogotá (COL)

References
 

1971 births
Living people
Colombian male cyclists
Vuelta a Colombia stage winners
People from Envigado
Sportspeople from Antioquia Department
20th-century Colombian people